The School of American Ballet (SAB) is the most renowned ballet school in the United States. School of American Ballet is the associate school of the New York City Ballet, a ballet company based at the Lincoln Center for the Performing Arts in New York City. The school trains students from the age of six, with professional vocational ballet training for students aged 11–18. Graduates of the school achieve employment with leading ballet companies worldwide, and in the United States with New York City Ballet, American Ballet Theatre, Boston Ballet, San Francisco Ballet, Miami City Ballet, Pacific Northwest Ballet and Houston Ballet.

History
The school was founded by the renowned Russo-Georgian-born choreographer George Balanchine, and philanthropists Lincoln Kirstein and Edward Warburg in 1934. Balanchine's self- prescribed edict, "But first, a school", is indicative of his adherence to the ideals of the training that was fostered by the Imperial Ballet School where he received his training. He realized that most great dance companies were fed by an academy closely associated with it. This practice afforded scores of dancers, well versed in the specifics of his technique and choreographic style.  Among the teachers there were many Russian emigres who fled the Russian Revolution: Pierre Vladimiroff, Felia Doubrovska, Anatole Oboukhoff, Hélène Dudin, Ludmilla Schollar, Antonina Tumkovsky, and Alexandra Danilova. Their intention was to establish a major classical ballet company in America, which would lead to the formation of today's New York City Ballet. The school was formed to train and feed dancers into the company. It opened at 637 Madison Avenue with 32 students on January 2, 1934, and the students first performed that June. Seventy-five years later, the School was awarded the National Medal of Arts by President Barack Obama.

Program

Students are chosen through audition. Children's division auditions for the 2007–08 school year included six-year-olds for the first time; previously, the youngest students were required to turn eight in the year they began their studies. Children in the younger divisions are able to perform in various ballets with the company including George Balanchine's famous The Nutcracker, A Midsummer Night's Dream, Peter Martins's Swan Lake, and The Sleeping Beauty. The most advanced students perform in a workshop at the end of each year where the heads of many prestigious ballet companies choose several of them to join their companies, including New York City Ballet. This started in 1965, when Alexandra Danilova sought and received approval from Balanchine to produce a spring workshop performance for the students. These workshops have become an important preview for many outstanding dancers.

The school also hosts a summer program, where it selects about 200 dance students from across the country to train for five weeks. This summer program is one of the most selective ballet summer programs in the country. During the summer program, students are divided into seven girls' classes and two boys' classes:

Girls' classes: 
 I
 II
 III
 IV
 V
 VI
 VII

Boys' classes: 
 intermediate men
 advanced men

A small group of students from the summer program may be invited to enroll in SAB's winter term.

During the winter term, students are divided into levels based on their age.

Girls' classes:
 Girls preparatory division 
 Children's division (Girls I-V)
 Intermediate division (B1 and B2)
 Advanced division (C1, C2 and D)

Boys' classes:
 Boys preparatory division
 Children's division (Boys I-IV)
 Intermediate men
 Advanced men

Boys typically spend two years in each level.

Faculty

As of August 2020, the faculty of School of American Ballet includes Jonathan Stafford (artistic director),  Kay Mazzo (chairman of faculty),  Dena Abergel, Marika Anderson, Aesha Ash, Megan Fairchild, Gonzalo Garcia, Craig Hall, Arch Higgins, Anthony Huxley, Sterling Hyltin, Megan Johnson, Katrina Killian, Meagan Mann, Allen Peiffer, Susan Pilarre, Andrew Scordato, Suki Schorer, Abi Stafford, Sheryl Ware.

Alumni

According to SAB, alumni of the School of American Ballet make up over 90% of New York City Ballet, all but two of the company at present. Some alumni include Mary Ellen Moylan, Maria Tallchief, Tanaquil LeClercq, Francisco Moncion, John Clifford, Nicholas Magallanes, Jacques d'Amboise, Debra Austin, Jillana, Allegra Kent, Arthur Mitchell, Patricia McBride, Paul Frame, Peter Frame, Edward Villella, Suzanne Farrell, Kay Mazzo, Kathryn Morgan, Garielle Whittle, Helgi Tomasson, Fernando Bujones, Gelsey Kirkland, Heather Watts, Merrill Ashley, Lourdes Lopez, Jock Soto, Peter Boal, Olivia Boisson, Alexandra Waterbury, Victoria Rowell, Kyra Nichols, Darci Kistler, Patrick Bissell, Damian Woetzel, Ethan Stiefel, Wendy Whelan, Alan Bergman, Llanchie Stevenson, Sarah Hay, Arlene Shuler, and Paloma Herrera as well as celebrities Sean Young, Ashlee Simpson, Macaulay Culkin, Lawrence Leritz, Vanessa Carlton, Megan Mullally, Alex Westerman, and Madeleine Martin.

Mae L. Wien Awards 

Lawrence A. Wien, his daughters and their families founded the Mae L. Wien Awards in their mother's name. SAB students are chosen each year on the basis of their outstanding promise and a faculty member is honored for distinguished service. New York City Ballet chief balletmaster Jonathan Stafford may give a third award to a young choreographer at his discretion.

In popular culture
School of American Ballet is featured in the 2020 Disney+ documentary On Pointe, showing the lives of several students during a year at the school.

References

External links
 

 
United States National Medal of Arts recipients
Ballet schools in the United States
Dance in New York City
1934 establishments in New York City